Spark (stylized as SPARK) is the third studio album by American rock duo Whitney. It was released on September 16, 2022, on Secretly Canadian.

Background
In the fall of 2019, band members Julian Ehrlich and Max Kakacek left Chicago for Portland, Oregon, after they both had recently gone through breakups. Due to the COVID-19 pandemic, they stayed in a rented house in Portland longer than expected, where they began working on what would become Spark. They wrote the album in Portland over the course of 14 months. It was recorded at Sonic Ranch in Tornillo, Texas.

The album is noted for its classic pop sound, rather than the duo's previous folk-soul sound. Kakacek described it as "trying to make music that sounds like the early 2000s," with influences including Usher, Ne-Yo, and Gwen Stefani. The album was produced by Brad Cook and John Congleton.

The album was announced on June 16, 2022, along with the release of the single "Real Love". On September 29, 2022, the band began a North American and European tour in support of the album.

Track listing

Charts

References 

2022 albums
Secretly Canadian albums
Albums recorded at Sonic Ranch